Gorgalan or Gargelan may refer to:

Gargelan, Kermanshah
Gorgalan, Lorestan